Libertador Municipality may refer to the following places in Venezuela:
Libertador Bolivarian Municipality, in the Venezuelan Capital District
Libertador Municipality, Aragua
Libertador Municipality, Carabobo
Libertador Municipality, Mérida
Libertador Municipality, Monagas
Libertador Municipality, Sucre
Libertador Municipality, Táchira

Municipality name disambiguation pages